The 2015 Individual Speedway World Championship Grand Prix Qualification is a series of motorcycle speedway meetings used to determine the three riders who qualified for the 2015 Speedway Grand Prix. The top eight riders finishing the 2014 Grand Prix series automatically qualify for 2015. The final round of qualification – the Grand Prix Challenge – took place on 20 September 2014 in Lonigo, Italy.

Qualifying rounds

Race-offs

Grand Prix Challenge 
20 September 2014
 Lonigo
 Zagar won the event following a ride-off with Doyle and Harris.  As he had qualified for the 2015 Grand Prix series, by virtue of his 5th-place finish in the overall 2014 Grand Prix standings, the 4th place rider, Janowski, was awarded a GP place.

See also 
 2014 Speedway Grand Prix

References 

2014 in speedway
2015 Speedway Grand Prix
Speedway Grand Prix Qualifications